Jaban (also Romanized as Jābān; also known as Jāhbun) is a village in Abarshiveh Rural District, in the Central District of Damavand County, Tehran Province, Iran. At the 2006 census, its population was 2,540, in 757 families.

References 

Populated places in Damavand County